The Valentine Davies Award, named after Valentine Davies, is a special award given to a member of the Writers Guild of America, West whose contributions to the entertainment industry and the community-at-large have brought dignity and honor to writers everywhere.

Recipients

References 

Writers Guild of America